Sangin is a district in the east of Helmand Province, Afghanistan. Its population was reported at 58,100 in 2012, all of which belong to Pashtun ethnic group. The district centre is the town of Sangin. The area is irrigated by the Helmand and Arghandab Valley Authority.

See also
Districts of Afghanistan

References

External links

 Map of Settlements AIMS, May 2002

Districts of Helmand Province